The State Migration Service of Ukraine (SMS) is a government agency of Ukraine that administers policy in the areas of immigration (both legal and illegal), emigration, and citizenship, as well as the resident registration (uk) system. It is part of the Ministry of Internal Affairs of Ukraine and was established in 2010.

Notes

References 

2010 establishments in Ukraine
Government agencies established in 2010
Immigration services
Immigration to Ukraine
Ministry of Internal Affairs (Ukraine)